Brice (some sources Bricius; others Brieius)

He was Archdeacon of Armagh in 1269   and Dean of Armagh in 1272; and appears in a deed dated 1301.

References

Deans of Armagh
Archdeacons of Armagh
13th-century Irish Roman Catholic priests
14th-century Irish Roman Catholic priests